The Lettuce was a vegetable used as political commentary in the United Kingdom in October 2022 towards then prime minister Liz Truss.

The Lettuce may also refer to:
"The Lettuce", a song on the 1998 album Deer Apartments by Matt Pond PA
The Lettuce, English translation of La Lechuga, an 18th-century Catholic monstrance

See also
 Lettuce (disambiguation)